Arnaud Tsedri (born 11 March 1975), better known by the stage name Arnaud Tsamere, is a French comedian, actor, television presenter and sports journalist. Born in Bordeaux and raised in the Yvelines, he joined the Déclic Théâtre group after quitting his sales job. There, he acted in plays and participated in improvisation events. He wrote his first one-man show, Réflexions profondes sur pas mal de trucs, in 2002 with Arnaud Joyet, and his second, Chose Promise, in 2007 with Joyet and François Rollin. His third, Confidences sur pas mal de trucs plus ou moins confidentiels, has been performed since 2014. He has attended numerous comedy festivals and is currently a member of the Ligue Majeure d'Improvisation.

Tsamere's television career began when he presented the weather forecast on Canal+. From 2010, he became well known for appearing on France 2's sketch comedy show On n'demande qu'à en rire—and its short-lived spin-off the ONDAR Show—after he was discovered by Laurent Ruquier; he often performed sketches with Jérémy Ferrari. He also plays Captain Sport Extrême in the comedy science fiction programme Hero Corp. In 2014, he hosted TMC's Canapé Quiz; he has also appeared on various French talk, sports and game shows. Tsamere has acted in several films, including the short Being Homer Simpson with Philippe Peythieu and Véronique Augereau, and Fonzy, a 2013 adaptation of Starbuck.

Early life
Tsamere's paternal grandparents are from Guipavas, and his father is Breton. He was born in Bordeaux, but grew up in Versailles, Rocquencourt and Trappes, in the Yvelines department. His father was a general in the French Air Force who was awarded the Legion of Honour, and his mother a housewife, whom he has described as "the best in her domain". He has two brothers. He describes himself as having had a "strict upbringing".

Speaking about his early life and its relation to his surreal comic style, Tsamere said:

I grew up in a very comfortable environment. I wanted for nothing; serious things never happened to me in life. I have never been a victim of injustice, so I have nothing to protest. I don't have any particular origins which would be interesting to talk about. ... So, I do absurd stuff because I don't want to talk about other things.

After getting his baccalauréat, he studied law at university, where he discovered an improvisational match in his first year and "fell in love" with the performance. In 1998, he obtained a master's degree in business law and later got a job working in export sales. However, he realised that he "could no longer live without the stage", and on the advice of his friend Arnaud Joyet and Déclic Théâtre co-founder Alain Degois, quit his job and launched his career as a comedian.

Career

Theatre and improvisation

After quitting his previous job, Tsamere took part in the Déclic Théâtre improvisation group under its co-founder Alain "Papy" Degois, who he said "pushed me, gave me confidence, coddled me [and] got me to act in plays and improvisation matches". Between 2003 and 2005, he played the baron Christian de Neuvillette in an adaptation of Cyrano de Bergerac at the Château de Gizeux with the theatre group La Pastière, to which he was introduced by Degois.

He began writing his first one-man show in 2002 with his friend Arnaud Joyet, inspired by a videotape of comedian François Rollin. The show, entitled Réflexions profondes sur pas mal de trucs (Profound reflections on quite a few things), played on theatrical "flops", a form of humour that Tsamere said "can seem easy [but] is not when you really start to work on it". It was performed at the Blancs Manteaux theatre from April 2005 to January 2006.

Tsamere met Rollin at the Dinard Comedy Festival, and he joined Tsamere and Joyet to write a second show, Chose Promise (Promised Thing). Written in 2007, it stars Tsamere as an economics teacher named Patrice Valenton, performing as part of a promise made to a friend who died in a car accident. He chose to perform as a character under Rollin's suggestion, so that he could depict failure under the guise of somebody who is not a comedian. Regarding the show's theme of death, he said "It's a bit strange, but it has the virtue of attracting the public's attention". Tsamere's performance was well received by critics; Le Parisien called the show a "masterpiece of the genre". Chose Promise was released on DVD on 6 March 2013 after being recorded at the Théâtre Sébastopol in Lille. Tsamere has done three tours of the show, and its final two performances were at the Olympia in February 2014.

Tsamere's third show, Confidences sur pas mal de trucs plus ou moins confidentiels (Secrets about quite a few more or less confidential things), also written with Rollin and Joyet, was performed on tour throughout France from November 2014, and at Le Splendid from January 2015. Tsamere has said it is based on the principal that "society laughs too much", and will involve him talking about himself.

On 25 June 2012 at the Européen theatre, Tsamere performed alongside the On n'demande qu'à en rire jury member Éric Métayer in Métamère en impro. He performed La tournée du trio with his On n'demande qu'à en rire colleague Jérémy Ferrari, and Baptiste Lecaplain; after a tour of 12 performances in Zéniths, they did several special performances in February 2014. Tsamere has attended comedy festivals such as the Montreux Comedy Festival, where he performed with Ferrari, and the Avignon Festival. He is now part of the Ligue Majeure d'Improvisation.

Television and radio
In 2005, with the help of Frédéric Testot, whom he met at a Puy-Saint-Vincent comedy festival, Tsamere got the job of presenting the weather forecast in Le Grand Journal on Canal+. He also appeared in Canal+'s SAV des émissions, presented by Testot and Omar Sy. After quitting the weather in June 2006, he hosted La longue nuit du pénis on the same channel that September. It was a night dedicated to the penis, which Tsamere has described as "nothing pornographic or erotic. It was a series of serious documentaries." He says he was asked after Frédérique Bel refused, because he was "probably the only one liable to accept".

In 2007 Tsamere met Simon Astier during the recording of the M6 show Off Prime. He was given the role of Captain Sport Extrême in Astier's comedy science fiction programme, Hero Corp, which is broadcast on France 4. He only appeared in one episode of the first series, but more frequently in the second. Speaking about the differences between himself and his character, Tsamere said "He is a misogynist, beastly, an adventurer, unattached... I am just the opposite". He also said "I've loved this character. I love playing crackpots."

In 2010 he participated in the sketch comedy talent show On n'demande qu'à en rire, created and presented by Laurent Ruquier and broadcast on France 2. Ruquier asked him to do so after he saw Tsamere in Monique est demandée caisse 12 and Le Comique. He has described it as "the missing piece of the puzzle" that allowed him to become well known. He already knew all of the original participants, except for Nicole Ferroni, whom he discovered at a comedy festival in Puy-Saint-Vincent in January 2011. He is friends with Jérémy Ferrari, with whom he has performed sketches on the show. The two share a well-known on-stage rivalry.

Based on puns involving crime and food, his sketch "L'avocat de la salade, la frite et la saucisse" was the first in the programme to achieve 99 out of 100 points. After participating in the show for two years and totalling 64 appearances, Tsamere announced in 2012 that he did not plan to return for its third season. However, he came back the next year after the cancellation of the ONDAR Show, and described his stage fright before his first performance after his return. When the show returned for its fourth season, he acted as patron (parrain) during the first week, and could save and work with eliminated candidates.

In September 2011, Tsamere appeared with On n'demande qu'à en rire colleague Jérémy Ferrari in two editions of Ruquier's late-night talk show On n'est pas couché—however, in what would have been their third week, they decided to quit the show as they thought that "our duo was not the right formula to succeed Jonathan [Lambert, their predecessor]", as well as to concentrate on their "solo projects". From October 2012 to January 2013, Tsamere took part in the ONDAR Show, a spin-off of On n'demande qu'à en rire in which its best comedians performed without judges in a format similar to American entertainment. However, the show was unpopular with critics—Le Nouvel Observateurs Xavier Rousseau called it a "failed show" that "dashed hopes"—and the ONDAR Show was cancelled after 13 episodes due to low viewing figures.

In 2013, Tsamere joined the team of beIN Sports' programme Lunch Time, which was hosted by Darren Tulett. In February 2014, it was announced that Tsamere would host the TMC game show Canapé Quiz, an adaptation of the American Hollywood Game Night. The show featured two teams, each composed of three celebrities and one member of the public, competing in a series of games. Three weeks later, TMC announced that Canapé Quiz had been cancelled and new episodes were to be moved to a later timeslot because of low viewing figures—10 days after its launch, it failed to pass 100,000 viewers. Discussing the show's audience in an interview on Europe 1, Tsamere stated that he did not care about the viewing figures, and also mentioned that he had received positive feedback about the show on Twitter, which he called "quite a revealing thing". He also stressed that he has fun when filming Canapé Quiz. From 13 July 2015, Tsamere will present the game show Une famille en or (the French version of Family Feud and Family Fortunes) when it returns on TMC; it was previously presented by Christophe Dechavanne from 2007 to 2014 on TF1. Tsamere said "It's the challenge of taking the reins of a cult programme that interested me".

He has also appeared on various game shows, including Mot de passe and Fort Boyard (French versions of Million Dollar Password and The Crystal Maze respectively), as well as the chat show La nuit nous appartient on NRJ 12. In 2012, he performed on Rire & Chansons, a comedy and musical radio station.

Film
In 2011, Tsamere's first film role was Séverin in Charles Nemes' Au bistro du coin. In the same year, he appeared in Pascale Pouzadoux's La Croisière, and in the short films Le Métro (directed by Dianeïa Schaefer) and Deal (Wilfried Méance). Tsamere played the character of Vincent in Arnaud Demanche's short film Being Homer Simpson, in which he appeared alongside Philippe Peythieu and Véronique Augereau, the voice actors of Homer and Marge respectively in the French dub of the animated series The Simpsons. He also starred alongside José Garcia in Fonzy, a remake of the film Starbuck, in which he plays Maître Chasseigne. It was released on 30 October 2013.

Sports journalism
Tsamere has written several columns about sport for the newspaper Le Monde, on topics such as golfer Tiger Woods, the cyclists Chris Froome and Lance Armstrong in the Tour de France, and the French football league Ligue 1. In July 2015, an article he wrote entitled "And then along came Sky and ruined everything", which accused Froome of doping, was cited by BBC News's Paris correspondent Hugh Schofield as an example of the hostility of the French press towards the cyclist.

Style and influences

Tsamere's style can be described as absurd humour, which according to him "has no hold on current events, politics or religion".{{efn|Original: n'a pas de prise, ni sur l'actualité, ni sur la politique, ni sur la religion}} He is a specialist in improvisation. He is known for his "slow burn" technique (a term coined by On n'demande qu'à en rire jury member Jean-Luc Moreau), in which he talks about a subject before moving on to another and repeatedly interrupting himself to return to the initial subject. His humour is popular with television audiences, and has boosted On n'demande qu'à en rire viewing figures.

On his website, Tsamere provides a link to that of François Rollin, as well as to that of English comedian Ricky Gervais, whom he calls "my absolute master". Other role models of his are the brothers Simon and Alexandre Astier—he says of them and Gervais that he "could watch them perform anything". He has stated that his favourite director is Tim Burton, linking this to his surreal style.

Personal life
Tsamere's partner is the racing driver and television presenter Margot Laffite (daughter of Jacques Laffite); their first child was born on 4 February 2015.

Tsamere is a cycling enthusiast and a fan of association football; he called the latter "My first great love to which I have remained faithful for so many years". He is a user of Twitter and describes himself as "a bit of a geek", but says that he never retweets fans. He uses an iPad, which he says has allowed him to read more: he "love[s] new technology like a kid". Tsamere quit smoking in June 2012, saying that tobacco "disgusted" him; he uses an electronic cigarette.

He enjoys romantic comedy films, of which his favourites are Pretty Woman and Notting Hill. Tsamere's favourite television programme is the Belgian documentary series Strip-Tease, and he describes himself as "a real TV addict". He also likes Grey's Anatomy, and Hero Corp, in which he appears—he says he is "not ashamed" to watch himself. He has read Une Vie by Guy de Maupassant, which he described as "so beautiful", and the biography of Apple Inc. founder Steve Jobs, which he said is "the story of an incredible life".

Credits

Film

Short films

Television

Non-fictional appearances

 2005: Le Grand Journal on Canal+ (weather presenter) 
 2005: SAV des émissions on Canal+
 2006: La longue nuit du pénis on Canal+
 2007: Made In Palmade on France 3
 2008: Pliés en 4 on France 4
 2010–2013: On n'demande qu'a en rire on France 2
 2011: On a tout révisé on France 2
 2011: On n'est pas couché on France 2 (in a duo with Jérémy Ferrari)
 2011: Mot de passe on France 2
 2011: Dance Street on France Ô
 2012: Turbo on  M6
 2012: Morandini! (with Lamine Lezghad, Kheiron and Verino)
 2012: Le Golden Show (episode 5)
 2012: Le News Show on Canal+
 2012: Fort Boyard on France 2
 2012: Paris tout compris on France 3
 2012: C à vous on France 5
 2012: On n'est pas des pigeons on RTBF
 2012: V6 on AB1
 2012–2013: ONDAR Show on France 2 (presenter)
 2012: La nuit nous appartient on NRJ 12 (with Jérémy Ferrari)
 2013: Lunch Time on beIN Sport 2013: Vendredi, tout est permis avec Arthur on TF1 
 2013: Le plus grand cabaret du monde on France 2
 2013: Les années bonheur on France 2
 2013: Comment ça va bien ! on France 2
 2013: L'équipe du soir on L'Équipe 21
 2014: Canapé Quiz on TMC (presenter)
 2015: Une famille en or on TMC (presenter)

Radio
 2011–: On va s'gêner on Europe 1 (regular commentator)
 2012: Rire & Chansons''

Theatre

Notes

References

General

Specific

External links

  
  
 

1975 births
Living people
21st-century French male actors
French comedians
French male film actors
French humorists
French people of Breton descent
French male stage actors
French male television actors
French television personalities
French television writers
Mass media people from Bordeaux
French male writers
Male screenwriters
Male actors from Bordeaux
Male television writers